Senator Skinner may refer to:

Alanson Skinner (1794–1876), New York State Senate
Avery Skinner (1796–1876), New York State Senate
Nancy Skinner (California politician) (born 1954), California State Senate
Roger Skinner (1773–1825), New York State Senate
Thomas Gregory Skinner (1842–1907), North Carolina State Senate
Thomson J. Skinner (1752–1809), Massachusetts State Senate
Timothy Skinner (fl. 1990s–2010s), Indiana State Senate